Escudella i carn d'olla, or shorter escudella, (lit. "bowl") is a traditional Catalan and Valencian meat and vegetable stew and soup. Francesc Eiximenis wrote in the 14th century that it was eaten every day by Catalan people.

It is characterized by the use of a pilota, a very big meatball spiced with garlic and parsley; it also contains vegetables as celery, cabbage, carrots, etc. depending on the season. Additionally, bones, sausages called botifarra, and other types of meat, can be used. In historical times a type called escudella de pagès, which had pasta and rice, was traditionally made on Thursdays and Sundays.

Service 
Escudella is typically served in two parts:
 The escudella proper is a soup consisting of a broth with pasta, rice or both.
 The carn d'olla is all the meat used in the broth, served afterwards in a tray along with the vegetables used.

When both parts are served mixed together, it is called escudella barrejada.

Escudella de Nadal 
There is a particular version of this soup that can be called "escudella de Nadal" (Christmas soup) or either "sopa de galets" (galets' soup) and it is very typical on Christmas Day. It includes meat from four different animals, a pilota, several vegetables and the traditional special type of pasta known as galets, which are snail-shaped and notable for their considerable size.

See also 
 Catalan cuisine
 List of soups
 List of stews

References 

Catalan cuisine
Spanish soups and stews
Meat stews